Vieru may refer to:

Igor Vieru (1923 – 1988), Moldovan painter
Anatol Vieru (1926 – 1998), Romanian composer
Grigore Vieru (1935 – 2009), Moldovan poet
Andrei Vieru (born 1958), pianist, writer and philosopher (son of Anatol)
Valerian Ciobanu-Vieru (born 1958), Moldovan writer
Ioan Vieru (poet) (born 1962), a Romanian poet
Ioan Vieru (born 1979), Romanian sprinter
Natalia Vieru (born 1989), Moldavian-born Russian basketball player
Vieru, a village in Putineiu Commune, Giurgiu County, Romania

Romanian-language surnames